Sherikasari is a newly separated small village from Alkuti village of Parner Taluka in Ahmednagar District of state of Maharashtra, India.

Religion
The majority of the population in the village is Hindu.
In India from the age of Ancient times, peoples of Maharashtra, Karnataka, Madhya Pradesh, Gujarat, Goa. etc. were worshiping Lord Shri Khondaba as Kuldevatha or Kuldaivath. Lord Shiva took avtar of Marthand Bhairav to defeat Mani and Malya Rakshas. That day was of Shudha Champasasthi. Since then Champasasthi is celebrated as "Khondaba Avatar Day".

Sherikasari- Parner 
The India Village Sherikasari, is located in the taluka of Parner, district of Ahmednagar, in the State of Maharashtra.

About Sherikasari 
 It belongs to Khandesh and Northern Maharashtra region
 It belongs to Nashik Division
 It is located 64 km towards west from District headquarters Ahmednagar
 28 km from Parner
 4 h 8 min (190  km) via NH61 Thane to Sherikasari
 184 km (Thane) from State capital Mumbai Sherikasari Pin code is 414305 and postal head office is Alkuti
 Garkhindi (4 km), Kalas (5 km), Darodi (5 km), Shirapur (7 km), Lonimawala (7 km) are the nearby villages to Sherikasari
 Sherikasari is surrounded by Shirur Taluka towards south, Junnar Taluka towards west, Ambegaon Taluka towards west, Khed Taluka towards west
 Shirur, Manchar, Junnar, Ahmednagar are the nearby cities to Sherikasari

Temple
 Charangbaba Temple Utsav in भाद्रपद शुक्ल २ Every Year this Utsav Organization to Charangbaba Mitra Mandal.
 Hanuman Temple.
 Mukatabai Temple.

Economy
The majority of the population has farming as their primary occupation.

Agriculture 
There are two seasons of cropping Kharif & Rabi. Wheat, Groundnut, Onions, Bajari are some of the main crops. But farmers in village are taking up the new way farming to yield non traditional crops like Tomato, Cabbage and making it success story

Education

Schools & Colleges 
 Rayat Kshishan Sanstha's Shri SAINATH High School and Jr. College (Science, Arts and MCVC) Alkuti.

 SAI Education Socity's English Medium School Alkuti
 Ashram Shala Alkuti
 Jilha Parishad Primary School, (Bahirobawadi) Alkuti

Finance

Near Banks 
 Central Bank of India
Ahmednagar District Central Co-Operative Bank
 Swami Samarth Bank, Nighoj-Alkuti
 Alkuti Gramin Patsanstha
 Senapati bapat Patsantha
 Parner Gramin Patsantha
 Kanhur Pathar Patsanstha
 Nighoj Gramin Patsanstha.

See also
 Parner taluka
 Villages in Parner taluka

References 

Villages in Parner taluka
Villages in Ahmednagar district